Borgo Santa Maria is a small town located 10 km south-west of Pesaro, in Marche, Italy. Its population amounted to 3,369 in 2001 (Istat census).

References

Cities and towns in the Marche
Frazioni of the Province of Pesaro and Urbino